Physical medicine and rehabilitation, also known as  physiatry, is a branch of medicine that aims to enhance and restore functional ability and quality of life to people with physical impairments or disabilities. This can include conditions such as spinal cord injuries, brain injuries, strokes, as well as pain or disability due to muscle, ligament or nerve damage.  A physician having completed training in this field may be referred to as a physiatrist.

Scope of the field
Physical medicine and rehabilitation encompasses a variety of clinical settings and patient populations.

In hospital settings, physiatrists commonly treat patients who have had an amputation, spinal cord injury, stroke, traumatic brain injury, and other debilitating injuries or conditions. In treating these patients, physiatrists lead an interdisciplinary team of physical, occupational, recreational and speech therapists, nurses, psychologists, and social workers.

In outpatient settings, physiatrists treat patients with muscle and joint injuries, pain syndromes, non-healing wounds, and other disabling conditions. Physiatrists are trained to perform injections into joints or muscle as a pain treatment option. Physiatrists are also trained in nerve conduction studies and electromyography.

History
During the first half of the 20th century, two unofficial specialties, physical medicine and rehabilitation medicine, developed separately, but in practice both treated similar patient populations consisting of those with disabling injuries. Frank H. Krusen was a pioneer of physical medicine, which emphasized the use of physical agents, such as hydrotherapy and hyperbaric oxygen, at Temple University and then at Mayo Clinic and it was he that coined the term 'physiatry' in 1938. Rehabilitation medicine gained prominence during both World Wars in the treatment of injured soldiers and laborers. Howard A. Rusk, an internal medicine physician from Missouri, became a pioneer of rehabilitation medicine after being appointed to rehabilitate airmen during World War II. In 1944, the Baruch Committee, commissioned by philanthropist Bernard Baruch, defined the specialty as a combination of the two fields and laid the framework for its acceptance as an official medical specialty. The committee also distributed funds to establish training and research programs across the nation. The specialty that came to be known as physical medicine and rehabilitation in the United States was officially established in 1947, when an independent Board of Physical Medicine was established under the authority of the American Board of Medical Specialties. In 1949, at the insistence of Dr. Rusk and others, the specialty incorporated rehabilitation medicine and changed its name to Physical Medicine and Rehabilitation.

Treatment
The major goal of physical medicine and rehabilitation treatment is to help a person function optimally within the limitations placed upon them by a disabling impairment or disease process for which there is no known cure. The emphasis is not on the full restoration to the premorbid level of function, but rather the optimization of the quality of life for those not able to achieve full restoration. A team approach to chronic conditions is emphasized to coordinate care of patients. Comprehensive rehabilitation is provided by specialists in this field, who act as facilitators, team leaders, and medical experts for rehabilitation.

In rehabilitation, goal setting is often used by the clinical care team to provide the team and the person undergoing rehabilitation for an acquired disability a direction to work towards. Very low quality evidence indicates that goal setting may lead to a higher quality of life for the person with the disability, and it not clear if goal setting used in this context reduces or increases re-hospitalization or death.

Not only must a physiatrist have medical knowledge regarding a patient's condition, but they also need to have practical knowledge regarding it as well.  This involves issues such as: what type of wheelchair best suits the patient, what type of prosthetic would fit best, does their current house layout accommodate their handicap well, and other every day complications that their patients might have.

Training
In the United States, residency training for physical medicine and rehabilitation is four years long, including an intern year of general medical training. There are 83 programs in the United States accredited by the Accreditation Council for Graduate Medical Education, in 28 states.

Specifics of training differs from program to program but all residents must obtain the same fundamental skills. Residents are trained in the inpatient setting to take care of multiple types of rehabilitation including: spinal cord injury, traumatic brain injury, stroke, orthopedic injuries, cancer, cerebral palsy, burn, pediatric rehab, and other disabling injuries. The residents are also trained in the outpatient setting to know how to take care of the chronic conditions patients have following their inpatient stay. During training, residents are instructed on how to properly perform several diagnostic procedures which include electromyography, nerve conduction studies and also procedures such as joint injections and trigger point injections.

Subspecialties
Seven accredited sub-specializations are recognized in the United States:
 Neuromuscular medicine
 Pain medicine
 Pediatric rehabilitation medicine
 Spinal cord injury
 Sports medicine
 Brain injury
 Hospice and palliative medicine

Fellowship training for other unaccredited subspecialties within the field include the following:
 Musculoskeletal/Spine
 Stroke
 Multiple sclerosis
 Neurorehabilitation
 Electrodiagnostic medicine
 Cancer rehabilitation
 Occupational and environmental medicine

See also
 American Osteopathic Board of Physical Medicine and Rehabilitation
 American Academy of Physical Medicine and Rehabilitation

References

External links

 What Is PM&R? gives a physical medicine and rehabilitation resident's description of the specialty and its appeal as a physician